(Jenico) Nicholas Dudley Preston, 17th Viscount Gormanston (born 19 November 1939), is a British hereditary peer who sat (as Baron Gormanston) in the House of Lords until 1999.

An Anglo-Irish aristocrat, Lord Gormanston is the premier viscount in the Peerage of Ireland (created 1478).

Family background

The only son and heir of Captain the 16th Viscount Gormanston (1914–1940) and Pamela Hanly, daughter of Captain Edward Hanly and Lady Marjorie Feilding (daughter of the 9th Earl of Denbigh), he succeeded to the family titles before his first birthday; the 16th Viscount (Captain Jenico William Preston, King's Own Yorkshire Light Infantry) was killed in action at Dunkirk during the Battle of France, 1940.

His maternal great-grandfather was General Sir William Butler, of Bansha Castle, County Tipperary, and his great-grandmother was the celebrated Victorian painter, Elizabeth Thompson (later Lady Butler). The 14th Viscount Gormanston GCMG was his paternal great-grandfather.

A Roman Catholic like his forebears, Lord Gormanston attended the Benedictine school of Downside, Somerset. A connoisseur of art, he lives in Kensington, London.

Gormanston Castle

The ancestral seat, Gormanston Castle in County Meath, Ireland, is no longer in the family's possession. The castle is fully maintained by the Franciscan Order of Friars Minor (OFM), bought in 1947. Shortly after its purchase, the order opened a boarding school for boys, Gormanston College, in the adjacent grounds; the college has since become a co-educational day school.

Personal life 
In 1974, Viscount Gormanston married his first wife Eva-Antonie Landzwójczaka (1955–1984). The marriage produced two sons:

 Hon. Jenico Francis Tara Preston, born 1974, heir apparent; commercial director, British Fashion Council then Future Olympia, married 2015 Kelly Catherine Reade (born 1978), global communications director, Jo Malone London, descended via her mother from the Marquises of Chaves, by whom he has one son ((Jenico Bertram Nicholas) Alfred Preston, born 2016);
 Hon. William Luke Preston, born in 1976, married 2016 Victoria Christensen.

Viscount Gormanston married, secondly, Lucy Arabella Fox (born 1960) on 2 November 1997.

See also 
 Viscount Gormanston

References

External links

www.hereditarypeers.com
www.debretts.com

1939 births
Living people
Robin Fox family
Preston family
People from Kensington
People educated at Downside School
20th-century Anglo-Irish people
British Roman Catholics
Conservative Party (UK) hereditary peers
Viscounts in the Peerage of Ireland
Gormanston